Autonational Rescue is a car breakdown service based in the United Kingdom (head office in Brentwood, Essex) that provides roadside and recovery assistance to motorists. The company has been running since 1992 and is administered by Equity Red Star, an appointed representative of Equity Syndicate Management Limited, authorized and regulated by the Financial Services Authority.

Equity Red Star has been insuring business and personal lines customers for more than 60 years, becoming established as one of the UK’s leading motor insurers. It provides Emergency Breakdown Assistance to over 500,000 members through a network of approximately 1,200 Breakdown Specialists who have in excess of over 5,000 vehicles at their disposal. They are primarily members of the Association of Vehicle Operators (AVRO) or the Road Rescue Recovery Association (RRRA).

Breakdown Services 

Autonational Rescue provides different levels of breakdown cover, ranging from the basic emergency assistance at the side of the road, to full recovery of the vehicle and passengers. They use a “mix and match” packaging that offers a basic starter service that can be augmented by extras.

Autonational Rescue was one of the first breakdown organizations to operate a “No Claims Bonus”, providing customers with a discount on their premiums if they had not had a breakdown in the 12 months previous to taking out a membership.

Awards 

Autonational Rescue was awarded “Best Online Breakdown Cover Provider”
in 2011’s edition of the Your Money Awards, organized by Your Money magazine.

Autonational Rescue was awarded “Best Online Breakdown Cover Provider”
in 2010’s edition of the Your Money Awards, organized by Your Money magazine.

Autonational Rescue were considered top scorer by a voting panel of Your Money readers throughout the UK.

Autonational Rescue came as 3rd favourite breakdown provider in the “2009 Driver Power” survey by Auto Express magazine.

Autonational Rescue was voted best Value for Money in the “2008 Driver Power” and runners up for the overall score survey by Auto Express magazine.

See also 

Vehicle recovery

References

External links 
 Autonational Rescue

Automobile associations in the United Kingdom
Organizations established in 1992
Emergency road services
Companies based in Brentwood, Essex